A cross section or cross-section, in geology, is a diagram representing the geologic features intersecting a vertical plane, and is used to illustrate an area’s structure and stratigraphy that would otherwise be hidden underground. The features described in a cross section can include rock units, faults, topography, and more. They often accompany geologic maps, complementing the overhead view with a side-on view, which can help to visualize the three-dimensional structure of the region and clarify the relationships between features.

A cross section is drawn as a vertical map, as if the ground had been cut open and exposed along a given line. Various lines, colors, patterns, and symbols are used to represent different rock sections and features. Because the length of the studied area is often much greater than the depth, the diagram's scale can be vertically exaggerated to emphasize the depth or height of features and make them more visible. The plane a cross section illustrates is typically labeled as a line on a map of the surrounding region. 

Cross sections are made by interpreting and extrapolating a broad range of information about a region's geological characteristics. This can include data from the surface, subsurface, and existing geologic maps. Analyzed data can include rock samples, structure orientation, boreholes, relationships between structures, seismic surveys, etc. Because much of the extrapolated information cannot be directly observed, there is an inherent amount of uncertainty about the accuracy of the final product.

See also
Section restoration

References

External links 

 USGS National Geologic Map Database

Geology